The Love Letter Tour was a summer tour headlined by R&B artist R. Kelly. It supported the album, Love Letter.

Opening acts
Keyshia Cole (North America)
Marsha Ambrosius (North America)

Setlist
This setlist was obtained from the concert held on June 30, 2011, at the Prudential Center in Newark, New Jersey. It does not represent all shows during the tour.
"Video Sequence" 
"Step in the Name of Love"  / "Red Carpet (Pause, Flash)" / "Chocolate Factory"
"Love Letter"
"Number One Hit"
"Happy People"
"Freaky in the Club"
"So Sexy" / "Hotel" / "Thoia Thoing" / "Slow Wind"
"Strip for You"
"TP-2"
"Video Sequence" 
"Home Alone" / "Gigolo" / "Snake" / "Use to Me Spending" / "I'm a Flirt"
"Ignition (Remix)"
"Fiesta" / "Number One" / "Friend of Mine" / "Feelin' On Yo Booty" / "Real Talk" / "Bump N' Grind" 
"In the Kitchen" / "Slow Dance (Hey Mr. DJ)" / "12 Play"
"It Seems Like You're Ready"
"Your Body's Callin'"
"When a Woman's Fed Up"
"Down Low (Nobody Has to Know)"
"R&B Thug"
"Video Sequence" 
"When a Woman Loves"
"Step in the Name of Love" 
"My Way"

Tour dates

Festivals and other miscellaneous performances
WZAK 30th Anniversary Celebration

Cancellations and rescheduled shows

Box office score data

References

2011 concert tours
R. Kelly concert tours